Kashmir is the northernmost geographical region of the Indian subcontinent. Until the mid-19th century, the term "Kashmir" denoted only the Kashmir Valley between the Great Himalayas and the Pir Panjal Range. Today, the term encompasses a larger area that includes the India-administered territories of Jammu and Kashmir and Ladakh, the Pakistan-administered territories of Azad Kashmir and Gilgit-Baltistan, and the Chinese-administered territories of Aksai Chin and the Trans-Karakoram Tract.

In 1820, the Sikh Empire, under Ranjit Singh, annexed Kashmir. In 1846, after the Sikh defeat in the First Anglo-Sikh War, and upon the purchase of the region from the British under the Treaty of Amritsar, the Raja of Jammu, Gulab Singh, became the new ruler of Kashmir. The rule of his descendants, under the paramountcy (or tutelage) of the British Crown, lasted until the Partition of India in 1947, when the former princely state of the British Indian Empire became a disputed territory, now administered by three countries: China, India, and Pakistan.

Etymology 
A popular local etymology of Kashmira is that it is land desiccated from water. 

An alternative etymology derives the name from the name of the Vedic sage Kashyapa who is believed to have settled people in this land. Accordingly, Kashmir would be derived from either kashyapa-mir (Kashyapa's Lake) or kashyapa-meru (Kashyapa's Mountain).

The word has been referenced to in a Hindu scripture mantra worshipping the Hindu goddess Sharada and is mentioned to have resided in the land of kashmira, or which might have been a reference to the Sharada Peeth.

The Ancient Greeks called the region Kasperia,  which has been identified with Kaspapyros of Hecataeus of Miletus (apud Stephanus of Byzantium) and Kaspatyros of Herodotus (3.102, 4.44). Kashmir is also believed to be the country meant by Ptolemy's Kaspeiria. The earliest text which directly mentions the name Kashmir is in Ashtadhyayi written by the Sanskrit grammarian Pāṇini during the 5th century BC. Pāṇini called the people of Kashmir Kashmirikas. Some other early references to Kashmir can also be found in Mahabharata in Sabha Parva and in puranas like Matsya Purana, Vayu Purana, Padma Purana and Vishnu Purana and Vishnudharmottara Purana.

Huientsang, the Buddhist scholar and Chinese traveller, called Kashmir kia-shi-milo, while some other Chinese accounts referred to Kashmir as ki-pin (or Chipin or Jipin) and ache-pin.

Cashmeer is an archaic spelling of modern Kashmir, and in some countries it is still spelled this way. Kashmir is called Cachemire in French, Cachemira in Spanish, Caxemira in Portuguese, Caixmir in Catalan, Casmiria in Latin, Cașmir in Romanian, and Cashmir in Occitan.

In the Kashmiri language, Kashmir itself is known as Kasheer.

Terminology

The Government of India and Indian sources, refer to the territory under Pakistan control "Pakistan-occupied Kashmir" ("POK"). The Government of Pakistan and Pakistani sources refer to the portion of Kashmir administered by India as "Indian-occupied Kashmir" ("IOK") or "Indian-held Kashmir" (IHK); The terms "India-administered Kashmir" and "Pakistan-administered Kashmir" are often used by neutral sources for the parts of the Kashmir region controlled by each country.

History 

In the first half of the first millennium, the Kashmir region became an important centre of Hinduism and later of Buddhism. During the 7th-14th centuries, the region was ruled by a series of Hindu dynasties, and Kashmir Shaivism arose. In 1339, Shah Mir became the first Muslim ruler of Kashmir, inaugurating the Salatin-i-Kashmir or Shah Mir dynasty. The region was part of the Mughal Empire from 1586 to 1751, and thereafter, until 1820, of the Afghan Durrani Empire.

Sikh rule 

In 1819, the Kashmir Valley passed from the control of the Durrani Empire of Afghanistan to the conquering armies of the Sikhs under Ranjit Singh of the Punjab. As the Kashmiris had suffered under the Afghans, they initially welcomed the new Sikh rulers. However, the Sikh governors turned out to be hard taskmasters, and Sikh rule was generally considered oppressive. Kashmir had also now begun to attract European visitors, several of whom wrote of the abject poverty of the vast Muslim peasantry and of the exorbitant taxes under the Sikhs. High taxes forced many Kashmiri peasants to migrate to the plains of the Punjab. Kashmir became the second highest revenue earner for the Sikh Empire. During this time Kashmir shawls became known worldwide, attracting many buyers, especially in the West.

The state of Jammu, which had been on the ascendant after the decline of the Mughal Empire, came under the sway of the Sikhs in 1770. Further in 1808, it was fully conquered by Maharaja Ranjit Singh. Gulab Singh, then a youngster in the House of Jammu, enrolled in the Sikh troops and, by distinguishing himself in campaigns, gradually rose in power and influence. In 1822, he was anointed as the Raja of Jammu. Along with his able general Zorawar Singh, he conquered and subdued Rajouri (1821), Kishtwar (1821), Suru valley and Kargil (1835), Ladakh (1834–1840), and Baltistan (1840), thereby surrounding the Kashmir Valley. He became a wealthy and influential noble in the Sikh court.

Princely state 

In 1845, the First Anglo-Sikh War broke out. According to The Imperial Gazetteer of India:

Gulab Singh contrived to hold himself aloof till the battle of Sobraon (1846), when he appeared as a useful mediator and the trusted advisor of Sir Henry Lawrence. Two treaties were concluded. By the first the State of Lahore (i.e. West Punjab) handed over to the British, as equivalent for one crore indemnity, the hill countries between the rivers Beas and Indus; by the second the British made over to Gulab Singh for 75 lakhs all the hilly or mountainous country situated to the east of the Indus and the west of the Ravi i.e. the Vale of Kashmir.

Drafted by a treaty and a bill of sale, and constituted between 1820 and 1858, the Princely State of Kashmir and Jammu (as it was first called) combined disparate regions, religions, and ethnicities: to the east, Ladakh was ethnically and culturally Tibetan and its inhabitants practised Buddhism; to the south, Jammu had a mixed population of Hindus, Muslims and Sikhs. In the heavily populated central Kashmir valley, the population was overwhelmingly Muslim—mostly Sunni, however, there was also a small but influential Hindu minority, the brahmin Kashmiri Pandits. To the northeast, sparsely populated Baltistan had a population ethnically related to that of Ladakh, but which practised Shia Islam. To the north, also sparsely populated, Gilgit Agency was an area of diverse, mostly Shia groups, and, to the west, Punch was populated mostly by Muslims of a different ethnicity than that of the Kashmir valley. After the Indian Rebellion of 1857, in which Kashmir sided with the British, and the subsequent assumption of direct rule by Great Britain, the princely state of Kashmir came under the suzerainty of the British Crown.

In the British census of India of 1941, Kashmir registered a Muslim majority population of 77%, a Hindu population of 20% and a sparse population of Buddhists and Sikhs comprising the remaining 3%. That same year, Prem Nath Bazaz, a Kashmiri Pandit journalist wrote: "The poverty of the Muslim masses is appalling. ... Most are landless laborers, working as serfs for absentee [Hindu] landlords ...  Almost the whole brunt of official corruption is borne by the Muslim masses." Under  Hindu rule, Muslims faced hefty taxation and discrimination in the legal system, and were forced into labor without any wages. Conditions in the princely state caused a significant migration of people from the Kashmir Valley to the Punjab of British India. For almost a century, until the census, a small Hindu elite had ruled over a vast and impoverished Muslim peasantry. Driven into docility by chronic indebtedness to landlords and moneylenders, having no education besides, nor awareness of rights, the Muslim peasants had no political representation until the 1930s.

1947 and 1948

Ranbir Singh's grandson Hari Singh, who had ascended the throne of Kashmir in 1925, was the reigning monarch in 1947 at the conclusion of British rule of the subcontinent and the subsequent partition of the British Indian Empire into the newly independent Dominion of India and the Dominion of Pakistan. According to Burton Stein's History of India, Kashmir was neither as large nor as old an independent state as Hyderabad; it had been created rather off-handedly by the British after the first defeat of the Sikhs in 1846, as a reward to a former official who had sided with the British. The Himalayan kingdom was connected to India through a district of the Punjab, but its population was 77 per cent Muslim and it shared a boundary with Pakistan. Hence, it was anticipated that the maharaja would accede to Pakistan when the British paramountcy ended on 14–15 August. When he hesitated to do this, Pakistan launched a guerrilla onslaught meant to frighten its ruler into submission. Instead the Maharaja appealed to Mountbatten for assistance, and the governor-general agreed on the condition that the ruler accede to India. Indian soldiers entered Kashmir and drove the Pakistani-sponsored irregulars from all but a small section of the state. The United Nations was then invited to mediate the quarrel. The UN mission insisted that the opinion of Kashmiris must be ascertained, while India insisted that no referendum could occur until all of the state had been cleared of irregulars.

In the last days of 1948, a ceasefire was agreed under UN auspices. However, since the plebiscite demanded by the UN was never conducted, relations between India and Pakistan soured, and eventually led to two more wars over Kashmir in 1965 and 1999.

Current status and political divisions
India has control of about half the area of the former princely state of Jammu and Kashmir, which comprises Jammu and Kashmir and Ladakh, while Pakistan controls a third of the region, divided into two provinces, Azad Kashmir and Gilgit-Baltistan. Jammu and Kashmir and Ladakh are administered by India as union territories. They formed a single State until 5 August 2019, when the state was bifurcated and its limited autonomy was revoked.

According to Encyclopædia Britannica:

Although there was a clear Muslim majority in Kashmir before the 1947 partition and its economic, cultural, and geographic contiguity with the Muslim-majority area of the Punjab (in Pakistan) could be convincingly demonstrated, the political developments during and after the partition resulted in a division of the region. Pakistan was left with territory that, although basically Muslim in character, was sparsely populated, relatively inaccessible, and economically underdeveloped. The largest Muslim group, situated in the Valley of Kashmir and estimated to number more than half the population of the entire region, lay in India-administered territory, with its former outlets via the Jhelum valley route blocked.

The eastern region of the former princely state of Kashmir is also involved in a boundary dispute that began in the late 19th century and continues into the 21st. Although some boundary agreements were signed between Great Britain, Afghanistan and Russia over the northern borders of Kashmir, China never accepted these agreements, and China's official position has not changed following the communist revolution of 1949 that established the People's Republic of China. By the mid-1950s the Chinese army had entered the north-east portion of Ladakh.

By 1956–57 they had completed a military road through the Aksai Chin area to provide better communication between Xinjiang and western Tibet. India's belated discovery of this road led to border clashes between the two countries that culminated in the Sino-Indian War of October 1962.

The region is divided amongst three countries in a territorial dispute: Pakistan controls the northwest portion (Northern Areas and Kashmir), India controls the central and southern portion (Jammu and Kashmir) and Ladakh, and the People's Republic of China controls the northeastern portion (Aksai Chin and the Trans-Karakoram Tract). India controls the majority of the Siachen Glacier area, including the Saltoro Ridge passes, whilst Pakistan controls the lower territory just southwest of the Saltoro Ridge. India controls  of the disputed territory, Pakistan controls , and the People's Republic of China controls the remaining .

Jammu and Azad Kashmir lie south and west of the Pir Panjal range, and are under Indian and Pakistani control respectively. These are populous regions. Gilgit-Baltistan, formerly known as the Northern Areas, is a group of territories in the extreme north, bordered by the Karakoram, the western Himalayas, the Pamir, and the Hindu Kush ranges.

Ladakh is between the Kunlun mountain range in the north and the main Great Himalayas to the south. Capital towns of the region are Leh and Kargil. It is under Indian administration and was part of the state of Jammu and Kashmir until 2019. It is one of the most sparsely populated regions in the area and is mainly inhabited by people of Indo-Aryan and Tibetan descent. Geographically part of the Tibetan Plateau, Aksai Chin is referred to as the Soda Plain. The region is almost uninhabited, and has no permanent settlements.

Though these regions are in practice administered by their respective claimants, neither India nor Pakistan has formally recognised the accession of the areas claimed by the other. India claims those areas, including the area "ceded" to China by Pakistan in the Trans-Karakoram Tract in 1963, are a part of its territory, while Pakistan claims the entire region excluding Aksai Chin and Trans-Karakoram Tract. The two countries have fought several declared wars over the territory. The Indo-Pakistani War of 1947 established the rough boundaries of today, with Pakistan holding roughly one-third of Kashmir, and India one-half, with a dividing line of control established by the United Nations. The Indo-Pakistani War of 1965 resulted in a stalemate and a UN-negotiated ceasefire.

Geography

It is bordered to the north and east by China (Xinjiang and Tibet), to the northwest by Afghanistan (Wakhan Corridor), to the west by Pakistan (Khyber Pakhtunkhwa and Punjab) and to the south by India (Himachal Pradesh and Punjab).
The topography of Kashmir is mostly mountainous. It is traversed mainly by the Western Himalayas. The Himalayas terminate in the western boundary of Kashmir at Nanga Parbat. Kashmir is traversed by three rivers namely Indus, Jehlum and Chenab. These river basins divide the region into three valleys separated by high mountain ranges. The Indus valley forms the north and north-eastern portion of the region which include bare and desolate areas of Baltistan and Ladakh. The upper portion of the Jhelum valley forms the proper Vale of Kashmir surrounded by high mountain ranges. The Chenab valley forms the southern portion of the Kashmir region with its denuded hills towards the south. It includes almost all of the Jammu region. High altitude lakes are frequent at high elevations. Lower down in the Vale of Kashmir there are many freshwater lakes and large areas of swamplands which include Wular Lake, Dal Lake and Hokersar near Srinagar.

To the north and northeast, beyond the Great Himalayas, the region is traversed by the Karakoram mountains. To the northwest lies the Hindu Kush mountain range. The upper Indus River separates the Himalayas from the Karakoram. The Karakoram is the most heavily glaciated part of the world outside the polar regions.

The Indus River system forms the drainage basin of the Kashmir region. The river enters the region in Ladakh at its southeastern corner from the Tibetan Plateau, and flows northwest to run a course through the entire Ladakh and Gilgit-Baltistan. Almost all the rivers originating in these region are part of the Indus river system. After reaching the end of the Great Himalayan range, the Indus turns a corner and flows southwest into the Punjab plains. The Jhelum and Chenab rivers also follow a course roughly parallel to this, and join the Indus river in southern Punjab plains in Pakistan.

The geographical features of the Kashmir region differ considerably from one part to another. The lowest part of the region consists of the plains of Jammu at the southwestern corner, which continue into the plains of Punjab at an elevation of below 1000 feet. Mountains begin at 2000 feet, then raising to 3000–4000 feet in the "Outer Hills", a rugged country with ridges and long narrow valleys. Next within the tract lie the Middle Mountains which are 8000–10,000 feet in height with ramifying valleys. Adjacent to these hills are the lofty Great Himalayan ranges (14000–15000 feet) which divide the drainage of the Chenab and Jehlum from that of the Indus. Beyond this range lies a wide tract of mountainous country of 17000–22000 feet in Ladakh and Baltistan.

Climate

Kashmir has a different climate for every region owing to the great variation in altitude. The temperatures ranges from the tropical heat of the Punjab summer to the intensity of the cold which keeps the perpetual snow on the mountains. Jammu Division, excluding the upper parts of the Chenab Valley, features a humid subtropical climate. The Vale of Kashmir has a moderate climate. The Astore Valley and some parts of Gilgit-Baltistan features a semi-Tibetan climate. While as the other parts of Gilgit-Baltistan and Ladakh have Tibetan climate which is considered as almost rainless climate.

The southwestern Kashmir which includes much of the Jammu province and Muzaffarabad falls within the reach of Indian monsoon. The Pir Panjal Range acts as an effective barrier and blocks these monsoon tracts from reaching the main Kashmir Valley and the Himalayan slopes. These areas of the region receive much of their precipitation from the wind currents of the Arabian Sea. The Himalayan slope and the Pir Panjal witness greatest snow melting from March until June. These variations in snow melt and rainfall have led to destructive inundations of the main valley. One instance of such Kashmir flood of a larger proportion is recorded in the 12th-century book Rajatarangini. A single cloudburst in July 1935 caused the upper Jehlum river level to rise 11 feet. The 2014 Kashmir floods inundated the Kashmir city of Srinagar and submerged hundreds of other villages.

Flora and fauna

Kashmir has a recorded forest area of  along with some national parks and reserves. The forests vary according to the climatic conditions and the altitude. Kashmir forests range from the tropical deciduous forests in the foothills of Jammu and Muzafarabad, to the temperate forests throughout the Vale of Kashmir and to the alpine grasslands and high altitude meadows in Gilgit-Baltistan and Ladakh.
The Kashmir region has four well defined zones of vegetation in the tree growth, due to the difference in elevation. The tropical forests up to 1500 m, are known as the Phulai (Acacia modesta) and Olive (Olea cuspid ata) Zone. There occur semi-deciduous species of Shorea robusta, Acacia catechu, Dalbergia sissoo, Albizia lebbeck, Garuga pinnata, Terminalia bellirica and T. tomentosa and Pinus roxburghii are found at higher elevations. The temperate zone between (1,500–3,500 m) is referred as the Chir Pine (Finns longifolia). This zone is dominated by oaks (Quercus spp.) and Rhododendron spp. The Blue Pine (Finns excelsa) Zone with Cedrus deodara, Abies pindrow and Picea smithiana occur at elevations between 2,800 and 3,500 m. The Birch (Betula utilis) Zone has Herbaceous genera of Anemone, Geranium, Iris, Lloydia, Potentilla and Primula interspersed with dry dwarf alpine scrubs of Berberis, Cotoneaster, Juniperus and Rhododendron are prevalent in alpine grasslands at 3,500 m and above.

Kashmir is referred as a beauty spot of the medicinal and herbaceous flora in the Himalayas. There are hundreds of different species of wild flowers recorded in the alpine meadows of the region. The botanical garden and the tulip gardens of Srinagar built in the Zabarwans grow 300 breeds of flora and 60 varieties of tulips respectively. The later is considered as the largest Tulip Garden of Asia.

Kashmir region is home to rare species of animals, many of which are protected by sanctuaries and reserves. The Dachigam National Park in the Valley holds the last viable population of Kashmir stag (Hangul) and the largest population of black bear in Asia. In Gilgit-Baltistan the Deosai National Park is designated to protect the largest population of Himalayan brown bears in the western Himalayas. Snow leopards are found in high density In the Hemis National Park in Ladakh. The region is home to musk deer, markhor, leopard cat, jungle cat, red fox, jackal, Himalayan wolf, serow, Himalayan yellow-throated marten, long-tailed marmot, Indian porcupine, Himalayan mouse-hare, langur and Himalayan weasel. At least 711 bird species are recorded in the valley alone with 31 classified as globally threatened species.

Demographics
In the 1901 Census of the British Indian Empire, the population of the princely state of Kashmir and Jammu was 2,905,578. Of these, 2,154,695 (74.16%) were Muslims, 689,073 (23.72%) Hindus, 25,828 (0.89%) Sikhs, and 35,047 (1.21%) Buddhists (implying 935 (0.032%) others).

The Hindus were found mainly in Jammu, where they constituted a little less than 60% of the population. In the Kashmir Valley, the Hindus represented "524 in every 10,000 of the population (i.e. 5.24%), and in the frontier wazarats of Ladhakh and Gilgit only 94 out of every 10,000 persons (0.94%)." In the same Census of 1901, in the Kashmir Valley, the total population was recorded to be 1,157,394, of which the Muslim population was 1,083,766, or 93.6% and the Hindu population 60,641. Among the Hindus of Jammu province, who numbered 626,177 (or 90.87% of the Hindu population of the princely state), the most important castes recorded in the census were "Brahmans (186,000), the Rajputs (167,000), the Khattris (48,000) and the Thakkars (93,000)."

In the 1911 Census of the British Indian Empire, the total population of Kashmir and Jammu had increased to 3,158,126. Of these, 2,398,320 (75.94%) were Muslims, 696,830 (22.06%) Hindus, 31,658 (1%) Sikhs, and 36,512 (1.16%) Buddhists. In the last census of British India in 1941, the total population of Kashmir and Jammu (which as a result of the Second World War, was estimated from the 1931 census) was 3,945,000. Of these, the total Muslim population was 2,997,000 (75.97%), the Hindu population was 808,000 (20.48%), and the Sikh 55,000 (1.39%).

The Kashmiri Pandits, the only Hindus of the Kashmir valley, who had stably constituted approximately 4 to 5% of the population of the valley during Dogra rule (1846–1947), and 20% of whom had left the Kashmir valley to other parts of India in the 1950s, underwent a complete exodus in the 1990s due to the Kashmir insurgency. According to a number of authors, approximately 100,000 of the total Kashmiri Pandit population of 140,000 left the valley during that decade. Other authors have suggested a higher figure for the exodus, ranging from the entire population of over 150, to 190 thousand (1.5 to 190,000) of a total Pandit population of 200 thousand (200,000), to a number as high as 300 thousand (300,000).

People in Jammu speak Hindi, Punjabi and Dogri, the Kashmir Valley speaks Kashmiri and the sparsely inhabited Ladakh speaks Tibetan and Balti.

The population of India-administered union territories of Jammu and Kashmir and Ladakh combined is 12,541,302 and Pakistan-administered territory of Azad Kashmir is 4,045,366, and Gilgit-Baltistan is 1,492,924.

Economy

Kashmir's economy is centred around agriculture. Traditionally the staple crop of the valley was rice, which formed the chief food of the people. In addition, Indian corn, wheat, barley and oats were also grown. Given its temperate climate, it is suited for crops like asparagus, artichoke, seakale, broad beans, scarletrunners, beetroot, cauliflower and cabbage. Fruit trees are common in the valley, and the cultivated orchards yield pears, apples, peaches, and cherries. The chief trees are deodar, firs and pines, chenar or plane, maple, birch and walnut, apple, cherry.

Historically, Kashmir became known worldwide when Cashmere wool was exported to other regions and nations (exports have ceased due to decreased abundance of the cashmere goat and increased competition from China). Kashmiris are well adept at knitting and making Pashmina shawls, silk carpets, rugs, kurtas, and pottery. Saffron, too, is grown in Kashmir. Srinagar is known for its silver-work, papier-mâché, wood-carving, and the weaving of silk. The economy was badly damaged by the 2005 Kashmir earthquake which, as of 8 October 2005, resulted in over 70,000 deaths in the Pakistan-administered territory of Azad Kashmir and around 1,500 deaths in the India-administered territory of Jammu and Kashmir.

Transport
Transport is predominantly by air or road vehicles in the region. It is expected to link  Kashmir to the rest of India after the construction of the railway line from Katra to Banihal is completed.

In culture

Irish poet Thomas Moore's 1817 romantic poem Lalla Rookh is credited with having made Kashmir (spelt Cashmere in the poem) "a household term in Anglophone societies", conveying the idea that it was a kind of paradise (an old idea going back to Hindu and Buddhist texts in Sanskrit).

See also
 1941 Census of Jammu and Kashmir
 Human rights abuses in Kashmir
 Kashmiris

Notes

References

Bibliography

General history 

 .
 .
 
 
 .
 .
 
 .
 
 .

Kashmir history

Historical sources 

 Blank, Jonah. "Kashmir–Fundamentalism Takes Root", Foreign Affairs, 78.6 (November/December 1999): 36–42.
 Drew, Federic. 1877. The Northern Barrier of India: a popular account of the Jammoo and Kashmir Territories with Illustrations; 1st edition: Edward Stanford, London. Reprint: Light & Life Publishers, Jammu. 1971.
 Evans, Alexander. Why Peace Won't Come to Kashmir, Current History (Vol 100, No 645) April 2001 p. 170–175.
 Hussain, Ijaz. 1998. "Kashmir Dispute: An International Law Perspective", National Institute of Pakistan Studies.
 Irfani, Suroosh, ed "Fifty Years of the Kashmir Dispute": Based on the proceedings of the International Seminar held at Muzaffarabad, Azad Jammu and Kashmir 24–25 August 1997: University of Azad Jammu and Kashmir, Muzaffarabad, AJK, 1997.
 Joshi, Manoj Lost Rebellion: Kashmir in the Nineties (Penguin, New Delhi, 1999).
 Khan, L. Ali The Kashmir Dispute: A Plan for Regional Cooperation  31 Columbia Journal of Transnational Law, 31, p. 495 (1994).
 Knight, E. F. 1893. Where Three Empires Meet: A Narrative of Recent Travel in: Kashmir, Western Tibet, Gilgit, and the adjoining countries. Longmans, Green, and Co., London. Reprint: Ch'eng Wen Publishing Company, Taipei. 1971.
 Knight, William, Henry. 1863. Diary of a Pedestrian in Cashmere and Thibet. Richard Bentley, London. Reprint 1998: Asian Educational Services, New Delhi.
 Köchler, Hans. The Kashmir Problem between Law and Realpolitik. Reflections on a Negotiated Settlement . Keynote speech delivered at the "Global Discourse on Kashmir 2008." European Parliament, Brussels, 1 April 2008.
 Moorcroft, William and Trebeck, George. 1841. Travels in the Himalayan Provinces of Hindustan and the Panjab; in Ladakh and Kashmir, in Peshawar, Kabul, Kunduz, and Bokhara... from 1819 to 1825, Vol. II. Reprint: New Delhi, Sagar Publications, 1971.
 Neve, Arthur. (Date unknown). The Tourist's Guide to Kashmir, Ladakh, Skardo &c. 18th Edition. Civil and Military Gazette, Ltd., Lahore. (The date of this edition is unknown – but the 16th edition was published in 1938).
 Stein, M. Aurel. 1900. Kalhaṇa's Rājataraṅgiṇī–A Chronicle of the Kings of Kaśmīr, 2 vols. London, A. Constable & Co. Ltd. 1900. Reprint, Delhi, Motilal Banarsidass, 1979.
 Younghusband, Francis and Molyneux, Edward 1917. Kashmir. A. & C. Black, London.
 Norelli-Bachelet, Patrizia. "Kashmir and the Convergence of Time, Space and Destiny", 2004; . First published as a four-part series, March 2002 – April 2003, in 'Prakash', a review of the Jagat Guru Bhagavaan Gopinath Ji Charitable Foundation. Kashmir and the Convergence of Time Space and Destiny by Patrizia Norelli Bachelet 
 Muhammad Ayub. An Army; Its Role & Rule (A History of the Pakistan Army from Independence to Kargil 1947–1999). Pittsburgh: Rosedog Books, 2005. .

External links

 United Nations Military Observers Group in Kashmir

 
Disputed territories in Asia
Divided regions
Historical regions
Kashmiri-speaking countries and territories
Regions of Asia
Frozen conflict zones